Satok may refer to:
Sątok
Satok (state constituency), represented in the Sarawak State Legislative Assembly